The U.S. routes in Washington are United States Numbered Highways that are owned and maintained by the U.S. state of Washington through the Washington State Department of Transportation (WSDOT).

The United States Numbered Highway System was approved and established on November 11, 1926 by the American Association of State Highway Officials (AASHO) and included eleven routes traveling through Washington.



Primary highways

Auxiliary highways

Special routes

See also

Notes

References

External links

Highways of Washington State

U.S. Routes